The following highways are numbered 545:

Canada

United States